KD Jebat is a  guided missile frigate currently serving in the Royal Malaysian Navy and one of the major naval assets for Malaysia. Jebat serves in the 23rd Frigate Squadron of the Royal Malaysian Navy.

Development 
The ship's class, built by Yarrow Shipbuilders (now BAE Systems Surface Fleet Solutions) in Glasgow, United Kingdom, is based on the F2000 frigate design. Jebat was launched in May 1995 and commissioned in May 1999. Jebat carries the lower pennant number (FFG29) to signify the seniority of this ship, which accommodates the Admiral of the Royal Malaysian Navy. (Hang Jebat succeeded Hang Tuah as Laksamana (Admiral) of the Malacca Sultanate, while Hang Lekiu was never made a Laksamana.)

The ship was a huge jump in capability compared to the frigates then operated by the Royal Malaysian Navy,  KD Rahmat (F24) and KD Hang Tuah (F76) (ex-HMS Mermaid). Nevertheless, the delivery and operational status of Jebat were delayed due to integration of combat systems problems. The purchase of this ship also involved a major Transfer of Technology (ToT) program as well as an offset program where some portion of the contract value would involve purchases and services contracted to Malaysian companies.

Characteristic
As for the weapon systems, Jebat equipped with one Bofors 57 mm gun and two MSI DS30M 30 mm cannon. For the missiles, there was 16 Sea Wolf surface-to-air missile for air defence and 8 MM40 Exocet block 2 anti-ship missile for anti surface warfare. Two triple Eurotorp B515 with A244-S ASW torpedoes also installed for anti submarine warfare.

References

External links

 Official Website of the Royal Malaysian Navy
 Lekiu class, Malaysia at naval-technology.com

Lekiu-class frigates
Ships built on the River Clyde
1995 ships
Frigates of Malaysia